Zvonko "Tiba" Strnad (1926–1979) was a Croatian footballer.

Career
Zvonko played for various clubs from his hometown, Zagreb, namely, Zagorec and Metalac, before coming in 1946 to the city's main club, NK Dinamo Zagreb, where he played until 1954 with only a brief interruption, playing 111 league matches and scoring 23 goals. The exceptions were the 1948–49 and 1949–50 season in which he moved to Belgrade and played in FK Partizan where he won the national Championship in the 1948–49 season. He played two matches for the B Yugoslav national team.

He was known as a fast right winger, with excellent dribbling skills and great crossing passes.

His career was prematurely ended by a meniscus injury.

References

External links
 Career story at Nogometni leksikon 
 Zvonko Strnad at Povijest Dinama

1926 births
1979 deaths
Footballers from Zagreb
Association football midfielders
Yugoslav footballers
NK Zagorec Krapina players
GNK Dinamo Zagreb players
FK Partizan players
Yugoslav First League players